Heranoshøi is a mountain in Lom Municipality in Innlandet county, Norway. The mountain is surrounded by several other notable mountains including Liaberget, Grjothovden, and Saukampen to the northeast; Kvitingskjølen to the north; Finnshalspiggen and Store Trollhøin to the northeast; and Nautgardstinden to the south.

See also
List of mountains of Norway

References

Lom, Norway
Mountains of Innlandet